Milutin Aleksić (born April 28, 1982) is a retired Serbian professional basketball player.

Professional career
A native of Belgrade, Aleksić began his career with KK Crvena zvezda. He moved to Montenegro in 2002 and spent one season and a half with Buducnost before going on loan to AEL Limassol midway through the 2003–04 season. He played for the following clubs: KK Crvena zvezda, KK Budućnost Podgorica, KK Hemofarm. Also played for PAOK BC (Greece), Spirou Charleroi (Belgium), ASK Riga (Latvia). 

He took part in the All-Star Games of FIBA Eurocup. In 2007 was a Capitan of Europe Team. He spent four seasons with Cyprus club Proteas EKA AEL and with this team, he became a champion of Cyprus 3 times. In 2007, he has announced The Best Player of Cyprus Championship. In January 2011, he joined Panionios B.C. in Greece.

In January 2012, he joined PAOK BC.

See also 
 List of KK Crvena zvezda players with 100 games played

References

External links
Milutin Aleksic at eurobasket.com
Milutin Aleksic at euroleague.net
Milutin Aleksic at proballers.com
Milutin Aleksic at realgm.com

1982 births
Living people
ABA League players
AEL Limassol B.C. players
ASK Riga players
AS Monaco Basket players
BC Donetsk players
KK Crvena zvezda players
KK Budućnost players
KK Hemofarm players
P.A.O.K. BC players
Serbian expatriate basketball people in Belgium
Serbian expatriate basketball people in Cyprus
Serbian expatriate basketball people in France
Serbian expatriate basketball people in Greece
Serbian expatriate basketball people in Latvia
Serbian expatriate basketball people in Monaco
Serbian expatriate basketball people in Montenegro
Serbian expatriate basketball people in Ukraine
Serbian men's basketball players
Spirou Charleroi players
Small forwards